Big Time Rush, (also known as BTR), is an American television sitcom created by Scott Fellows about the Hollywood misadventures of four hockey players from Minnesota—Kendall, James, Carlos, and Logan, after they are selected to form a boy band. The series premiered with an hour-long pilot episode, "Big Time Audition", on Nickelodeon, on November 28, 2009. Its official debut episode premiered on January 18, 2010, earning 6.8 million viewers, making it Nickelodeon's highest-rated live-action series debut ever. The final episode aired on July 25, 2013, after four seasons comprising a total of 74 episodes.

Series overview

Episodes

Season 1 (2009–10) 
 This season was filmed from August 2009 to April 2010.
 Season 1 consisted of 20 episodes.
 Kendall Schmidt, James Maslow, Carlos Pena Jr., Logan Henderson, and Stephen Kramer Glickman were present for all episodes.
 Ciara Bravo was absent for one episode, 1x16 "Big Time Sparks".
 Nicole Scherzinger, Jordin Sparks, Fabio Lanzoni, and Ed Begley, Jr. all made guest appearances during the season.

Season 2 (2010–12) 
 This season was filmed from July 2010 to May 2011.
 This season has 29 episodes.
 This is the longest season in the entire show. 
Tanya Chisholm joins the main cast in this season as Kelly Wainwright.
 Kendall Schmidt, James Maslow, Carlos Pena Jr., Logan Henderson, and Ciara Bravo were present for all episodes.
 Tanya Chisholm and Stephen Kramer Glickman were absent for one episode.
 Miranda Cosgrove, Snoop Dogg, Fabio Lanzoni, Ed Begley, Jr., Tom Kenny, Russell Brand, Gage Golightly, Malese Jow, Elizabeth Gillies, Cymphonique Miller, Forrest Burnham, Jeanine Mason, and Cedric Yarbrough all made guest appearances during the season.

Film (2012)

Season 3 (2012) 
On May 24, 2011, Nickelodeon renewed Big Time Rush for a third season.
Malese Jow joins the show Recurring as Lucy Stone. Filming for this season began on April 3, 2012.

Rachel Crow, Alfonso Ribeiro, Fabio Lanzoni, and Chris Paul all made guest appearances during the season.

Season 4 (2013) 
On August 6, 2012, Nickelodeon renewed Big Time Rush for a 13-episode fourth season. Cher Lloyd, Nick Cannon, Austin Mahone, Victoria Justice, and more guest-starred in this season.
 This is the final season of Big Time Rush. This season was filmed from January 2013 to May 2013.

References

External links 
 
 Big Time Rush on Nick.com

Lists of American sitcom episodes
Lists of Nickelodeon television series episodes
Big Time Rush episodes